The Mayoral election of 1977 in Pittsburgh, Pennsylvania was held on Tuesday, November 1, 1977. The incumbent mayor, Richard Caliguiri, had ascended to the office just 10 months earlier, after longtime mayor Pete Flaherty resigned to take a position in the newly formed Jimmy Carter White House. The former City Council President chose to renounce his lifelong Democratic Party membership for the election and run for his first full term as an Independent.

Primary elections
Allegheny County Commissioner Tom Foerster, a powerful party leader, won the Democratic Primary. He was victorious in a contentious battle over city Controller Frank Luccino and fellow city Councilman Jim Sims.

General election
Caliguiri had originally planned not to seek reelection, but a personal clash with Foerster over environmental issues and mass transit funding led to Caliguiri reentering the race; because the filing deadline for the primary had already passed, the Democrat was forced to run as an independent. With Republican attorney Joe Cosetti a nonfactor in the heavily Democratic city, Caliguiri emerged victorious in a highly contested race between two fixtures of area politics.  A total of 143,967 votes were cast.

References

1977 Pennsylvania elections
1977 United States mayoral elections
1977
1970s in Pittsburgh
November 1977 events in the United States